Dardis is an Irish surname.

People with the surname

 John Dardis (born 1945), Irish politician 
 Martin Dardis (1922–2006), American soldier, police officer, investigator and reporter who linked the Watergate burglars to President Nixon's reelection committee
 Tom Dardis (1926–2001), American author and editor
Rena Dardis (1924–2017), publisher and founder of Anvil Press and The Children's Press.

See also
 Dardi (disambiguation)

References 

Surnames
Irish families
Surnames of Irish origin
Anglicised Irish-language surnames